The 2022 FIU Panthers football team represented Florida International University (FIU) as a member of Conference USA (C-USA) during the 2022 NCAA Division I FBS football season. Led by first-year head coach Mike MacIntyre, the Panthers compiled an overall record of 4–8 with a mark of 2–6 in conference play, placing in a three-way tie for ninth in C-USA. FIU played home games at Riccardo Silva Stadium in Westchester, Florida,

Preseason

C-USA media day
The Conference USA media day was held on July 27 at Globe Life Field in Arlington, Texas. The Panthers were represented by head coach Mike MacIntyre, wide receiver Tyrese Chambers, and defensive lineman Davon Strickland. The Panthers were predicted to finish in last place in the conference's preseason poll.

Schedule

Game summaries

Bryant

at Texas State

at Western Kentucky

at New Mexico State

UConn

UTSA

at Charlotte

Louisiana Tech

at North Texas

Florida Atlantic

at UTEP

Middle Tennessee

References

FIU
FIU Panthers football seasons
FIU Panthers football